William Michael Petrolle (January 10, 1905 – May 14, 1983) was a world lightweight boxing title contender. Boxing ran in the Petrolle family as his brothers Pete and Frank also shared his occupation. Statistical boxing website BoxRec lists Petrolle as the #18 ranked lightweight of all-time. Petrolle is member of the Minnesota Boxing Hall of Fame, the Ring Magazine Hall of Fame, the World Boxing Hall of Fame,  and the International Boxing Hall of Fame.

Professional career
Nicknamed "The Fargo Express", Petrolle is perhaps best known for challenging World Lightweight Title holder Tony Canzoneri.  In 1932 the two met for the World Lightweight Title, and Canzoneri was "squarely at his peak: a Canzoneri so magnificently conditioned, so beautifully attuned that even the old-timers at the ringside admitted he was worthy to stand alongside the lightweight giants of the past." (United Press). Petrolle dropped a decision in the bout at Madison Square Garden.

Petrolle was managed by promoter Jack Hurley.(18 November 1972). Jack Hurley Dies; Boxing Manager, The New York Times

Life after boxing

Petrolle retired during the Great Depression with $200,000 and an iron foundry in Duluth, Minnesota. He later owned a religious goods and gift shop in Duluth, and was the chairman of the Board of Directors of the Pioneer National Bank.

Honors
Petrolle has graced the covers of The Ring Magazine in May 1927, March 1931, and May 1932. An article on him appeared in the July 2008 issue.

Petrolle is mentioned in the novel Catch-22 during the trial of Clevinger. The quote reads "In sixty days you'll be fighting Billy Petrolle," the colonel with the big fat mustache roared. "And you think it's a big fat joke."  In this context "fighting Billy Petrolle" was a metaphor for facing combat in World War II.

Professional boxing record
All information in this section is derived from BoxRec, unless otherwise stated.

Official record

All newspaper decisions are officially regarded as “no decision” bouts and are not counted in the win/loss/draw column.

Unofficial record

Record with the inclusion of newspaper decisions in the win/loss/draw column.

References

External links
 
CBZ page

World lightweight boxing champions
1905 births
1983 deaths
Boxers from Pennsylvania
American male boxers